Świrski is the name two different Polish noble families who do not share same descents. It is a toponymic surname literally meaning , in the case of Świrskis of Lis clan or "of Świrz", in the case of Świrskis of Szaława clan, see Svirzh Castle. Belarusian-language form: Swirsky, Russian: Svirsky, Lithianian: Svirskis. 

Notable persons with this surname include:

Jerzy Świrski (1882-1959), Polish vice admiral and officer in the Russian Imperial Navy and later the Polish Navy
 Peter Swirski (born 1966), Canadian scholar and literary critic

See also
Swirski mite

Polish-language surnames
Toponymic surnames